Canada's Wonderland is a  theme park located in Vaughan, Ontario, Canada, a suburb directly north of Toronto and owned by Cedar Fair. When Canada's Wonderland first opened in 1981 under Kings Entertainment Company ownership, there were 26 attractions. Today, there are 69, including the attractions inside Splash Works, a water park adjacent to the main theme park. Since the opening of the amusement park, at least one attraction has been added every year except 2009 and 2013. In addition, SkyRider closed permanently in 2014; it was the only roller coaster to close in the park's history and was relocated to Italy. SkyHawk, a Sky Roller by Gerstlauer Rides, and Flying Eagles from Larson International opened in 2016. The 2017 additions include Soaring Timbers and Muskoka Plunge and the 2018 additions include Lumberjack and Flying Canoes; Soaring Timbers, Lumberjack, and Flying Canoes are flat rides, while Muskoka Plunge is a water ride.

Up until 1992, Canada's Wonderland did not have a water park. Eleven years after the park opened, Splash Works was constructed in the area surrounding the Mighty Canadian Minebuster. Original plans and park maps during construction of the park show that the area that is now Splash Works and formerly White Water Canyon was originally planned to be a themed area called "Frontier Canada", a section of the park devoted to the Canadian wilderness. Although this section became realized in 2019, albeit under Cedar Fair management, several of the elements that were to be included are scattered across the park before then. Yukon Striker, a dive coaster from Bolliger & Mabillard, was added in 2019 in the Frontier Canada section to replace SkyRider.

For safety, Canada's Wonderland uses a ride rating system that classifies the attractions based on the intensity of the ride. The ratings vary from 1, for rides that are calm and gentle, to 5, for rides that have high speeds, aggressive forces, and rapid elevation changes. A separate set of ride ratings criteria is used for attractions inside Splash Works, though the rides are still rated on a scale from 1 to 5.

Main theme park

Splash Works

Splash Works opened in 1992, eleven years after Canada's Wonderland opened. Four years later, Canada's Wonderland expanded the water park by adding Whitewater Bay (a wave pool), The Pump House (an interactive children's playground), and The Black Hole (an enclosed water slide). There were two more expansions in 1999 and 2002, introducing new slides and attractions to the water park.

12 years later, the park announced that Splash Works would receive a new water slide, Typhoon, and an interactive aquatic playground, Splash Station.

In 2017, Muskoka Plunge opened, replacing the former Body Blast. 2018 saw the addition of two new children's slides & the renovation of the Splash Island Kiddie Pool, transforming the area into Lakeside Lagoon. The 2020 season introduced Mountain Bay Cliffs, a cliff-jumping attraction featuring platforms of various heights that guests can jump off of into a large pool. The opening of the attraction was delayed to the 2021 season due to the COVID-19 pandemic.

Some attractions require a personal flotation device (PFD; "lifejacket") in order to ride.

Notes

 Denotes the requirement that guests pay an additional fee for the ride or attraction.
 Denotes that the ride is similar to another manufacturer's model name.

See also
 List of former and renamed Canada's Wonderland attractions

References

External links
 Thrill rides at Canada's Wonderland
 Family rides at Canada's Wonderland
 Kid rides at Canada's Wonderland
 Splash Works at Canada's Wonderland

Canada's Wonderland
 List of attractions